Australian actor Hugh Jackman is known for his performances on the stage and screen.

He has won international recognition for his roles in major films, notably as superhero, period, and romance characters. Jackman has received a Primetime Emmy Award, a Grammy Award, and two Tony Awards. Jackman received a Golden Globe Award and was nominated for the Academy Award, Screen Actors Guild Award, and Critics' Choice Movie Award for his work in Tom Hooper's Les Miserables (2012).

Major Awards

Academy Awards

British Academy Film Awards

Emmy Awards

Golden Globe Awards

Grammy Awards

Screen Actors Guild Awards

Tony Awards

Film awards

AACTA Awards

Bambi Award

Critics' Choice Awards

Empire Awards

MTV Movie Awards

Kids' Choice Award

People's Choice Awards

Saturn Award

Television awards

Slammy Awards

Theatre awards

Drama Desk Award

Helpmann Awards

Laurence Olivier Award

Miscellaneous awards

Mo Awards
The Australian Entertainment Mo Awards (commonly known informally as the Mo Awards), were annual Australian entertainment industry awards. They recognise achievements in live entertainment in Australia from 1975 to 2016. Hugh Jackman won five awards in that time.
 (wins only)
|-
| 1996
| Hugh Jackman
| Male Musical Theatre Performer of the Year
| 
|-
| 1997
| Hugh Jackman
| Male Musical Theatre Performer of the Year
| 
|-
| 2003
| Hugh Jackman
| Australian Showbusiness Ambassador 
| 
|-
| 2004
| Hugh Jackman
| Australian Showbusiness Ambassador 
| 
|-
| 2006
| Hugh Jackman
| Australian Performer of the Year 
| 
|-

Other accolades

In November 2008, People magazine named Jackman that year's "Sexiest Man Alive."

On 21 April 2009, Jackman had his hand and footprint ceremony at the Grauman's Chinese Theatre.

He was awarded Best Performance by a Human Male award as Wolverine and a joint award for Best Cast award during the 2009 Spike Video Game Awards for the game X-Men Origins: Wolverine.

Along with the cast, Jackman won Audie Awards for Audiobook of the Year and Multi-Voiced Performance in 2010 for Nelson Mandela's Favorite African Folktales

In December 2012, Jackman received a star on Hollywood's Walk of Fame.

In 2014, Jackman was nominated for a Razzie, along with the rest of the cast of Movie 43, for Worst Screen Combo.

In 2019, after portraying Wolverine for 17 years in nine films, Jackman earned the Guinness World Record of the longest career as a live-action Marvel superhero.

In 2019, Jackman was awarded his medal as a Companion of the Order of Australia, the highest of the four levels of the Order of Australia.

References

Jackman, Hugh
Awards